Gullspång Municipality (Gullspångs kommun) is a municipality in Västra Götaland County in western Sweden. Its seat is located in the towns of Gullspång and Hova.

The present municipality was formed through the amalgamation of the former entities of Amnehärad, Hova and part of Visnum. The name was taken from the locality Gullspång.

Geography
Gullspång Municipality borders to Mariestad Municipality and Töreboda Municipality in Västra Götaland County It also borders on Laxå Municipality in Örebro County to the east and on Kristinehamn Municipality in Värmland County to the north.

The southern part of the municipality contains the northern part of Swedish national park Tiveden.

Localities
Gullspång 
Gårdsjö
Hova 
Otterbäcken 
Skagersvik

The two main towns are Hova and Gullspång. The central administration is placed in Hova, thus constituting the municipal seat, but there are also offices in Gullspång. Because of the rivalry between Gullspång and Hova the municipality prefers to call them the "two main localities" ("huvudtätorter").

Local churches
 Södra Råda Old Church

References

External links
 
 Gullspång Municipality - Official site

Municipalities of Västra Götaland County
Skaraborg